The Roman Catholic Diocese of Luiza is a diocese located in the territory of Luiza in the Ecclesiastical province of Kananga in the Democratic Republic of the Congo.

On January 3, 2014, Pope Francis accepted the resignation of Luiza's bishop, Léonard Kasanda Lumembu and appointed as his successor Félicien Mwanama Galumbulula, a former university professor who was second secretary of the Episcopal Conference of the Democratic Republic of the Congo (CENCO) from 2008 to 2014. He was installed on March 23, 2014.

History
 September 26, 1967: Established as the Diocese of Luiza from the Metropolitan Archdiocese of Luluabourg
 March 25, 2022: Lost territory to establish the Diocese of Tshilomba

Leadership
Bishops of Luiza
 Archbishop (personal title) Bernard Mels, C.I.C.M. (September 26, 1967 – October 3, 1970)
Bishop Godefroid Mukeng’a Kalond, C.I.C.M. (August 30, 1971 – March 3, 1997), appointed Archbishop of Kananga
 Bishop Léonard Kasanda Lumembu, C.I.C.M. (April 3, 1998 – January 3, 2014)
 Bishop Félicien Mwanama Galumbulula (January 3, 2014 – present)

See also
Roman Catholicism in the Democratic Republic of the Congo

References

External links
 
 

Roman Catholic dioceses in the Democratic Republic of the Congo
Christian organizations established in 1967
Roman Catholic dioceses and prelatures established in the 20th century
Roman Catholic Ecclesiastical Province of Kananga